Coca-Cola Orange Vanilla, formerly Coca-Cola Orange and in some markets Coca-Cola with Orange, is a variation of Coca-Cola originally available for a limited time. It was introduced in June 2007, in only Gibraltar, following the success of the previous year's Coca-Cola Lime, for which 40% of the launch sales represented new customers and increased purchasing.

The current, similar product, Coca-Cola Orange Vanilla, was released in the United States on February 25, 2019.

Consumer market
Coca-Cola Orange was designed to appeal to regular drinkers of Coca-Cola and of its citrus variants, Coke with Lemon and Coke with Lime. The cola was initially flavored with orange only. Coca-Cola Orange was produced in 330ml cans, 500ml plastic bottles, and two-liter plastic bottles.

Coca-Cola Orange is no longer available in the United Kingdom, except in Coca-Cola Freestyle fountain machines; the drink is also available in Latvia and Russia. Coca-Cola Orange was available for a limited time in the first half of 2017 in Brazil as a seasonal product.

History
In Germany in the 1970s, Coca-Cola sold its beverage Mezzo Mix, a drink with a similar formula to Coca-Cola Orange. Mezzo Mix is also known as Naranja & Cola or Fanta Mezzo Mix in Spain. The Swedish name for it is Fanta Mezzo, where it was released in January 2017 for a major music festival.

Mezzo Mix was offered among eight original international soda flavors for tasting at Epcot's Club Cool. In the 1990s, there were two kinds of Mezzo Mix, orange and lemon. Spezi is another beverage out of Germany that mixes cola with orange, Naranja & Cola.

In July 2007, Mezzo Mix introduced a low-calorie option, Mezzo Mix Zero, to compete with other major brands that were crossing over into the health-conscious market. The product is popular globally, but in the United States, it is only available in Coca-Cola Freestyle fountain machines (since 2009).

Formulation
Coca-Cola Orange lists "orange fruit from concentrate (1%)" in the ingredients. Coca-Cola Orange went on sale in Japan in November 2014, though the Japanese version contained no actual fruit juice.

Nutrition 
According to the Coca-Cola website the drink contains 140 calories. There are 0g of fat, 35 mg of sodium (1%DV), 39g of Carbohydrates all of which are added sugars (78%DV).

References

External links
 

Coca-Cola brands
Orange sodas
Products introduced in 2007